Smith Bay is a settlement on the East End of the island of St. Thomas in the United States Virgin Islands.

Beaches on the Atlantic coast of Smith Bay include Sugar Bay, Lindquist Beach (Smith Bay Park), and Sapphire Beach.

References

Populated places in Saint Thomas, U.S. Virgin Islands
East End, Saint Thomas, U.S. Virgin Islands